Nick Fraser (born 21 January 1948) is a British documentary producer and journalist.

Education
Fraser was educated at Eton, and graduated from Exeter College, Oxford in 1969.

BBC and Storyville 
Fraser spent seventeen years at the BBC, where he created and ran the international documentary strand Storyville. In 2016 he left the BBC to launch the documentary streaming platform Docsville.

Books and The Why Foundation 
Fraser is also a founder and executive producer of the Danish nonprofit organisation The Why Foundation, and has authored several non-fiction books.

Honors and awards 
Fraser received the 2017 BAFTA Special Award for his work in the field of documentary.

Bibliography 

 2019 Say What Happened: A Story of Documentaries. Faber & Faber, 9780571329571.
 2012 The Importance of Being Eton. Hachette UK, 9781780721590.
 2012 Why Documentaries Matter. Reuters Institute for the Study of Journalism, Department of Politics and International Relations, University of Oxford, 9781907384097.
 2000 The Voice of Modern Hatred: Encounters with Europe's New Right. Picador, 9780330372121.

References 

British producers
British journalists
1948 births
Living people
People educated at Eton College
Alumni of Exeter College, Oxford